The women's sprint competition of the cycling events at the 2011 Pan American Games was held between October 18 and 19 at the Pan American Velodrome in Guadalajara. The defending champion is Julio César Herrera of Cuba.

Schedule
All times are Central Standard Time (UTC-6).

Results

Qualification
Fastest 12 riders continue to the eighth finals.

Eighth finals
The winners of each advance to the quarterfinals, while the losers advance to the repechage.

Repechage
The winner of each advanced to the quarterfinals.

Quarterfinals

Semifinals

Fifth to eighth place

Finals

References

Track cycling at the 2011 Pan American Games
Men's sprint (track cycling)